Lepsia was a town of ancient Greece on the island of same name). 

Its site is located near modern Leipsoi.

References

Populated places in the ancient Aegean islands
Former populated places in Greece